The House of Normandy designates the noble family which originates from the Duchy of Normandy and whose members were counts of Rouen, dukes of Normandy, as well as kings of England following the Norman conquest of England. It lasted until the House of Plantagenet came to power in 1154. The house emerged from the union between the Viking Rollo (first ruler of Normandy) and Poppa of Bayeux, a West Frankish noblewoman. William the Conqueror and his heirs down through 1135 were members of this dynasty.

After that it was disputed between William's grandchildren, Matilda, whose husband Geoffrey was the founder of the House of Plantagenet, and Stephen of the House of Blois (or Blesevin dynasty).

The Norman counts of Rouen were:
Rollo, 911–927
William Longsword, 927–942

The Norman dukes of Normandy were:
Richard I, 942–996 
Richard II, 996–1027 
Richard III, 1026–1027 
Robert I, 1027–1035 
William, 1035–1066 (became King of England as William the Conqueror)

The Norman monarchs of England and Normandy were:
William the Conqueror, 1066–1087
William II, 1087–1100 (not Duke of Normandy) 
Robert II, 1087–1106 (not King of England) 
Henry I, 1100–1135; 1106–1135 
William Adelin, 1120 (not King of England) 
Matilda, 1135–1153
Stephen (non-agnatic; a member of the House of Blois), 1135–1154 

Norman Count of Flanders:
William Clito (r. 1127–1128), son of Robert Curthose, great-grandson of Baldwin V, designated by Louis VI of France

Family tree

Counts of Rouen and Dukes of Normandy shown in bold.

References and notes

|-

|-

|-

|-

 
Viking Age in France
French noble families
Normandy
Royal houses of England
Normandy